Haughton railway station was a station in Haughton, Staffordshire, England. The station was opened on 1 June 1849 and closed in May 1949.

References

Further reading

Disused railway stations in Staffordshire
Railway stations in Great Britain opened in 1849
Railway stations in Great Britain closed in 1949
Former London and North Western Railway stations